Benson James Boone (born June 25, 2002) is an American singer-songwriter and multi-instrumentalist. He was born in Monroe, Washington.

Early Life
Benson Boone grew up as the only boy of five siblings in Monroe, Washington. He attended Monroe High School and competed on the diving team. He first discovered his musical talent when a friend asked him to play piano and sing in their high school's battle of the bands his junior year even though he had no experience singing. Boone briefly attended Brigham Young University–Idaho before leaving after a semester to focus on singing.

Career
Boone drew early musical inspiration from attending a Jon Bellion concert, after which he began taking singing seriously. He began posting singing videos to TikTok, and auditioned for season 19 of American Idol on a friend's recommendation in early 2021. Though he was invited to advance to the show's Hollywood week, he was not present, as Boone withdrew from the show after making it to the Top 24 to consider his career.

Boone began sharing snippets of his original music on TikTok, where he amassed 1.7 million followers in advance of his first single release. He caught the attention of Imagine Dragons frontman Dan Reynolds, who signed Boone to his record label Night Street Records in partnership with Warner Records. The signing was announced October 15, 2021, alongside the release of Boone's first single "Ghost Town". Boone played drums, guitar, and piano on the recording, in addition to designing the artwork for the single. Boone performed "Ghost Town", which charted in 13 countries including the US on the Billboard Hot 100, on The Ellen DeGeneres Show, The Kelly Clarkson Show, and Late Night with Seth Meyers.

Boone released his second single "Room for 2" on February 18, 2022.

Discography

Extended plays

Singles

Other charted songs

Notes

References

External links
 www.bensonboone.com

2002 births 
21st-century American male singers
21st-century American singers
American Idol participants 
American male singer-songwriters
Living people 
People from Monroe, Washington
Singer-songwriters from Washington (state)
Warner Records artists